The 2020–21 Norfolk State Spartans men's basketball team represented Norfolk State University in the 2020–21 NCAA Division I men's basketball season. The Spartans, led by eighth-year head coach Robert Jones, played their home games at the Joseph G. Echols Memorial Hall in Norfolk, Virginia as members of the Mid-Eastern Athletic Conference. With the creation of divisions to cut down on travel due to the ongoing COVID-19 pandemic, they played in the Northern division. They finished the season 17–8, 8–4 in MEAC play to finish in tie for first place in the Northern division. They defeated North Carolina Central in the quarterfinals of the MEAC tournament and advanced to the championship when North Carolina A&T withdrew from the tournament due to COVID-19 protocols. They defeated Morgan State to win the tournament championship. As a result, they received the conference's automatic bid to the NCAA tournament as a No. 16 seed in the West region. They defeated Appalachian State in the First Four, but were eliminated by No. 1 overall seed Gonzaga in the first round.

Previous season
The Spartans finished the 2019–20 season 16–15, 12–4 in MEAC play to finish in a tie for second place. They were scheduled to play Coppin State in the quarterfinals of the MEAC tournament, but the remainder of the tournament was canceled due to the ongoing COVID-19 pandemic.

Roster

Schedule and results

|-
!colspan=12 style=| Regular season

|-
!colspan=12 style=| MEAC tournament
|-

|-
!colspan=12 style=| NCAA tournament

|-
|-

Sources

References

Norfolk State Spartans men's basketball seasons
Norfolk State Spartans
Norfolk State Spartans men's basketball
Norfolk State Spartans men's basketball
Norfolk State